John Denver is the 13th studio album by American singer-songwriter John Denver released in January 1979. It contains a live version of "Berkeley Woman" which was found in its original studio version on Farewell Andromeda.

This album was re-released in 1998 with bonus tracks.

Track listing
All songs by John Denver unless otherwise noted.

Side one

 "Downhill Stuff" – 3:32
 "Sweet Melinda" (Steve Gillette, Dave Mackechnie) – 2:27
 "What’s on Your Mind" – 4:26
 "Joseph and Joe" – 3:37
 "Life Is So Good" – 1:56
 "Berkeley Woman" (Bryan Bowers) – recorded live during John Denver's spring tour of 1978; the only live track on the album – 4:10

Side two

 "Johnny B. Goode" (Chuck Berry) – 3:02
 "You’re So Beautiful" – 3:09
 "Southwind" (Herb Pedersen) – 3:27
 "Garden Song" (David Mallett) – 2:38
 "Songs of…" – 5:23

Personnel and album dedication
John Denver – guitar, vocals
Hal Blaine – percussion
James Burton – guitar
Emory Gordy Jr. – bass
Glen Hardin – piano
Jim Horn – flute, piccolo, reeds
Herb Pedersen – banjo, guitar
Renee Armand-Horn – vocals
Denny Brooks – guitar
Danny Wheetman – fiddle, harmonica

Original album artwork gave the following album dedication:
"I would like to dedicate this album to the musicians and the singers.
Hal Blaine – James Burton – Emory Gordy, Jr. – Glen D. Hardin – Jim Horn – Herb Pedersen – Renee Armand-Horn – Denny Brooks – Danny Wheetman"

Re-release in 1998 with bonus tracks
The John Denver album was re-released in 1998 with five bonus tracks. These tracks were originally released in 1970 as Side 1 of the “Whose Garden Was This” album.
All songs by John Denver unless otherwise noted.

Bonus tracks

 "Tremble If You Must" (Paul Potash)
 "Sail Away Home"
 "The Night They Drove Old Dixie Down" (Robbie Robertson)
 "Mr. Bojangles" (Jerry Jeff Walker)
 "I Wish I Could Have Been There (Woodstock)"

Charts

References

John Denver albums
1979 albums
Albums produced by Milt Okun
RCA Records albums